This is a list of PPAD-complete problems.

Fixed-point theorems 

 Sperner's lemma
 Brouwer fixed-point theorem
 Kakutani fixed-point theorem

Game theory 
 Nash equilibrium
 Core of Balanced Games

Equilibria in game theory and economics 

 Fisher market equilibria
 Arrow-Debreu equilibria
 Approximate Competitive Equilibrium from Equal Incomes
 Finding clearing payments in financial networks

Graph theory 
 Fractional stable paths problems
 Fractional hypergraph matching (see also the NP-complete Hypergraph matching)
 Fractional strong kernel

Miscellaneous 
 Scarf's lemma
 Fractional bounded budget connection games

References 

  Paper available online at Papadimitriou's Homepage.
 

PPAD-complete problems
Computational problems